McAdam is an unincorporated community in Pulaski County, in the U.S. state of Virginia.

References

Unincorporated communities in Virginia
Unincorporated communities in Pulaski County, Virginia